British America comprised the colonial territories of the English Empire, which became the British Empire after the 1707 union of the Kingdom of England with the Kingdom of Scotland to form the Kingdom of Great Britain, in the Americas from 1607 to 1783. Prior to the union, this was termed English America, excepting Scotland's failed attempts to establish its own colonies. Following the union, these colonies were formally known as British America and the British West Indies before the Thirteen Colonies declared their independence in the American Revolution (1765–1791) and formed the United States of America. 

After the American Revolutionary War, the term British North America was used to refer to the remainder of Great Britain's possessions in North America. The term British North America was used in 1783, but it was more commonly used after the Report on the Affairs of British North America (1839), generally known as the Durham Report.

History 

A number of English colonies were established in America between 1607 and 1670 by individuals and companies whose investors expected to reap rewards from their speculation. They were granted commercial charters by Kings James I, Charles I, and Charles II, as well as Parliament. The London Company founded the first permanent settlement in 1607 on the James River at Jamestown, Virginia upstream from Chesapeake Bay. This was followed in 1620, when the Pilgrims established the Plymouth settlement in New England. English Catholics settled the Province of Maryland in 1634, under Cecilus Calvert, second Lord Baltimore.

A state department in London known as the Southern Department governed all the colonies beginning in 1660, as well as a committee of the Privy Council called the Board of Trade and Plantations. In 1768, Parliament created a specific state department for America, but it was disbanded in 1782 when the Home Office took responsibility for the remaining possessions of British North America in Eastern Canada, the Floridas, and the West Indies.

British America gained large amounts of territory with the Treaty of Paris of 1763, which ended the French and Indian War in America and the Seven Years' War in Europe. At the start of the American Revolutionary War in 1775, the British Empire included 23 colonies and territories on the North American continent. The Treaty of Paris of 1783 ended the Revolutionary War, and Britain lost much of this territory to the newly formed United States. In addition, Britain ceded East and West Florida to the Kingdom of Spain, which in turn ceded them to the United States in 1821. Most of the remaining colonies to the north formed Canada in 1867, with the Dominion of Newfoundland joining in 1949.

In the Caribbean, the British West Indies and other European sugar colonies were at the center for the Atlantic slave trade.

North American colonies in 1775 

The Thirteen Colonies that became the original states of the United States:

 New England Colonies
Province of Massachusetts Bay
Province of New Hampshire
Colony of Rhode Island and Providence Plantations
Connecticut Colony

 Middle Colonies
Province of New York
Province of New Jersey
Province of Pennsylvania
Delaware Colony

 Southern Colonies
Province of Maryland
Colony of Virginia
Province of North Carolina
Province of South Carolina
Province of Georgia

Colonies and territories that became part of Canada:

Province of Quebec northeast of the Great Lakes (including Labrador until 1791)
Nova Scotia (including New Brunswick until 1784)
Island of St. John
Colony of Newfoundland
Rupert's Land
North-Western Territory
British Arctic Territories

Colonies and territories that were ceded to Spain or the United States in 1783:

Province of East Florida (Spanish 1783–1823, U.S. after 1823)
Province of West Florida (Spanish 1783–1823, U.S. after 1823)
Indian Reserve (U.S. after 1783)
Province of Quebec southwest of the Great Lakes (U.S. after 1783)

Colonies in the Caribbean, Mid-Atlantic, and South America in 1783 
 Bermuda
 Divisions of the British Leeward Islands
Saint Christopher (de facto capital)
Antigua
Barbuda
British Virgin Islands
Montserrat
Nevis
Anguilla

 Island of Jamaica and its dependencies
Island of Jamaica
Settlement of Belize in British Honduras
Mosquito Coast
Bay Islands
Cayman Islands
Old Providence Island Colony

 Other possessions in the British Windward Islands
Island of Barbados
Island of Grenada
Island of St. Vincent
Island of Tobago (detached from Grenada in 1768)
Island of Dominica (detached from Grenada in 1770)

See also 

 Evolution of the British Empire
 British colonization of the Americas
 Colonial history of the United States
 Former colonies and territories in Canada
 British colonization of Australia
 British colonization of New Zealand
 British North America Acts
 British overseas territories

References 

1607 establishments in the British Empire
1783 disestablishments in North America
1783 disestablishments in the British Empire
British colonization of the Americas
British North America
Colonial United States (British)
Colonization history of the United States
English-speaking countries and territories
History of the Caribbean
States and territories established in 1607